Robert Stewart (born 1894) was a Scottish footballer who played mainly as a left half, for Motherwell – 292 appearances in the Scottish Cup and Scottish Football League (all in its top division) – and Ayr United – 77 matches overall.

References

1894 births
Date of birth missing
20th-century deaths
Year of death missing
Scottish footballers
Footballers from Motherwell
Association football wing halves
Association football central defenders
Ayr United F.C. players
Motherwell F.C. players
Royal Albert F.C. players
Larkhall Thistle F.C. players
Scottish Junior Football Association players
Scottish Football League players